Oakland Catholic High School is a private, Roman Catholic college preparatory school for girls, located in the Oakland neighborhood of Pittsburgh, Pennsylvania, United States, within the Diocese of Pittsburgh.   It was established by Bishop Donald Wuerl in 1989 as the merger of former all-girl parish high schools of Sacred Heart and St. Paul Cathedral to serve as a sister school for Central Catholic.  Approximately 600 students matriculate at Oakland Catholic and the school draws female students from all over the City of Pittsburgh and the suburbs.  Upon graduation, 100% of its students continue to a four-year university.

Oakland Catholic High School completed construction and renovations for the 2008-2009 school year.

Athletics
Oakland Catholic offers 17 different sports stretching over three seasons (fall, winter and spring.)

FALL SPORTS
Crew
Cross Country
Field Hockey
Golf
Soccer
Tennis
Volleyball

WINTER SPORTS
Basketball
Competitive Cheer
Fencing
Indoor Track
Step Team
Swimming/Diving

SPRING SPORTS
Crew
Lacrosse
Softball
Track & Field
Ultimate

HIGHLIGHTS
BASKETBALL - Oakland Catholic is known for its girls basketball team. From 1998–2008 they were involved in every District Championship (W.P.I.A.L.) game. They also won several Pennsylvania State Championship titles. The current Women's Head Basketball Coach is OC alumna, Brianne O'Rourke, OCHS'05 and former director of the Woman's Basketball Operations at the University of Pittsburgh.

SWIMMING - Oakland Catholic swimming also has a number of state championships. Oakland Catholic Swimming is widely known throughout the region for its multiple W.P.I.A.L. and State (P.I.A.A.) Titles.

SOCCER - Oakland Catholic Girls Soccer won the WPIAL Class 3A Championship in 2018. The Eagles also advanced to the PIAA State semi-finals finishing with an overall record of 20-2, which is the best soccer season in OCHS history to date.

Academic departments
English
Fine Arts
Foreign Languages
Health/Physical Education
Math
Religion
Science
Social Studies

Notable alumni 
 Leah Smith
 Amanda Polk
 Gianna Martello, choreographer for the Abby Lee Dance Company from Dance Moms

Notes and references

External links
 About the school
 School history
 Articles about Oakland Catholic from the Pittsburgh Tribune-Review
 "High School Playbook" hosted by WTAE
 "Faith in small school results in big honor" from the Pittsburgh Tribune-Review
 Article about the remodeling and expansion of the school from the Pittsburgh Tribune-Review

Girls' schools in Pennsylvania
Catholic secondary schools in Pennsylvania
High schools in Pittsburgh
Educational institutions established in 1989
1989 establishments in Pennsylvania